Juhu (Pronunciation: [d͡ʒuɦuː]) is a suburb of Mumbai. It is known for the sprawling Juhu Beach. It is surrounded by the Arabian Sea to the west, Versova to the north, Vile Parle to the east and Santacruz to the south. Juhu is among the most expensive and affluent areas of the metropolitan area and home to many Bollywood celebrities. The nearest railway stations are Santacruz, Andheri and Vile Parle on the Western Line and Harbour Line of the Mumbai Suburban Railway. The nearest metro stations are D. N. Nagar and Andheri West. There are two minor B.E.S.T bus depots in Juhu.

J. R. D. Tata, the father of civil aviation in India, made his maiden voyage to Juhu Airport from Drigh Road airstrip, Karachi, via Ahmedabad, on 15 October 1932 carrying mail in a Puss Moth aircraft.

History
In the nineteenth century, Juhu was an island: a long, narrow sand bar rising above sea level by a metre or two, just off the west coast of Salsette. It could be reached during low tides by walking across the tidal inlet.

Juhu was called "Juvem" by the Portuguese. At its north point, nestled the village of Juhu, inhabited by Bhandaris (toddy tappers), Agris (salt traders) and Kunbis (cultivators) and at its south point, opposite Bandra island, lived a small colony of fisherfolk and cultivators (Koliwada). The inhabitants of Juhu were mainly Koli people and there was a small section of Goans. The Church of St. Joseph was built by the Portuguese in 1853.
The open beaches of Juhu have attracted the well-heeled and the most affluent among Mumbai's population for almost a century. In the 1890s, Jamsetji Tata purchased land on Juhu and built a bungalow there. He planned to develop  in Juhu Tara. This was to yield 500 plots of  each and a seaside resort. Simultaneously he wanted to extend the Mahim Causeway to Santacruz, to access to this area. After his death in 1904, the scheme was abandoned. With the dawn of aviation in the 20th century, the Bombay Flying Club commenced operations in 1929 at what eventually became the present Juhu Aerodrome.

During the Indian independence movement, Mahatma Gandhi visited Mumbai and took several walks along Juhu Beach. A famous photograph of Gandhi poking his grandson Kanaa during a walk on the beach was taken in 1937. To mark Gandhi's visit to Juhu, a statue of him was installed by the beach and a lane near the beach was named Gandhigram Road. There is also a school named after him, the Gandhi Shiksha Bhavan school, in Juhu.

In the 1970s, Bhaktivedanta Swami (Srila Prabhupada) started the Hare Krishna Movement and built ISKCON Temple, giving Juhu its global recognition. He also gave various philosophical and spiritual discourses and wrote many books here.

Founded in 1928 as India's first civil aviation airport, Juhu aerodrome served as the city's primary airport during and up to World War II.

In the 1990s, a group of terror suspects detonated a bomb in a Juhu hotel, as well as in a number of other locations.

Climate
Juhu enjoys a uniform climate throughout the year. The weather remains hot through winter. Monsoons prevail from mid-June to September, when it rains quite heavily.

Juhu Beach 
Juhu Beach is located on the shores of the Arabian Sea. It stretches for six kilometres up to Versova.The short, rocky formations make up the Juhu Beach unlike the Marina Beach in Chennai that is primarily sandy. It is a tourist attraction throughout the year and is also a destination for shooting films. The beach generally gets more crowded on weekends and public holidays. The food court at its main entrance is known for its 'Mumbai style' street food, notably bhelpuri, pani puri and sev puri. Horse-pulled carriages used to offer joyrides to tourists for a small fee but have been banned now. Acrobats, dancing monkeys, cricket matches, toy sellers,Youth are playing old games vie for tourist's attention. The beach is among the most popular sites in the city for the annual Ganesh Chaturthi celebrations where thousands of devotees arrive in grand processions, carrying idols of the Lord Ganesh of various sizes, to be immersed in the sea at the beach. Juhu Beach is also a common spot for plane spotting as a portion of it lies underneath the departure path from Runway 27 and occasionally, the arrival path from Runway 09 of Mumbai Airport. There are several small entrances to the beach throughout the stretch, however the main and most used entrance is near Hotel Ramada Plaza By Wyndham Palm Grove. The best time to visit Juhu Beach is from September to May, as during the monsoon period of June to August the tide is mostly high which makes it dangerous to wander around on the beach.

Home to celebrities 

The busy-yet-peaceful surroundings of Juhu is home to many Bollywood celebrities and a significant number of Mumbai's business elite. Hence, Juhu has come to be referred to as the "Beverly Hills of Bollywood".

Juhu Citizen Welfare Group
The Juhu Citizen Welfare Group is the outcome of many years of activism by Juhu residents who have been associated with other NGOs. It was formed in April 2002 (The Juhu Seatizen) and later formalised in August 2003 with its own monthly publication called The Juhu Citizen. Officially registered in March 2004, it now comprises voluntary members invited from NGOs in the K-West Municipal Ward of North West Mumbai.

Religious places

 International Society for Krishna Consciousness (ISKCON) also known as Hare Krishna Mandir
 Mukteshwar Devalay (Gandhigram Road)
 Chandra Prabhu Jain Temple
 Mahalaxmi Temple
 St. Joseph's Church, Juhu
 Holy Cross Church, Juhu Koliwada
 Vittal Rukmani Temple, Juhu Koliwada
 Grand Mosque Juhu (Opposite Juhu Garden)

References

Suburbs of Mumbai
Beaches of Mumbai